Ivan Nikolayevich Smirnov (9 September 1955 in Moscow, USSR – 15 November 2018) was regarded as one of the greatest guitar players in Russia. He was proficient in many different styles, such as fusion, world, Russian folk, folk-jazz, and new flamenco. Smirnov lived in Russia and played with musicians such as Mikhail Smirnov,  Sergey Klevensky, Dmitry Safonov, and Aleksei Kozlov.

Affiliations
1975—1979: Moscow's fusion group Second Breath .
1979−1983: Experimental electronic music ensemble  Boomerang  (Бумеранг) under direction of Eduard Artemyev.
1983: Vocal Instrumental Ensemble Blue Guitars  (Голубые Гитары).
1984−1990: Jazz-rock ensemble  Arsenal (Арсенал) under direction of Aleksei Kozlov.
1990: Work under his own music projects, concerts with his own group, composing music for the cinema and studio work.

Recognition
The Best Guitar Player of the year (1995, Russia, Music Box Journal Professional Request).
The Best Guitar Player of the year (1996, Russia, Music Box Journal Professional Request).
The Best Fusion Guitar Player (1994, Russia,  Jam (Джем) television program, Jury: Allan Holdsworth, Steve Lukather, Scott Henderson, Bruce Kulick).
The Best Guitar Player (1994, Russia,  Totals-94  (Итоги-94) Professional Request).

Discography

Solo work
1996  Merry-go-Round Man  (Карусельный дед), CD/MC, — Music Box records. MB0001-2. 
1999  At the other end of the world  (За тридевять земель), CD / MC, — Smirnov Records.  ISCD 99-001.
2003  The Land Where The Sun Slumbers  (Страна, где ночует солнце), live  in  Le Club  (Russia), 2 CD/МС, — Sketis records.  ISMC 99-001.

Collaborations
1986  Arsenal  ensemble,  Pulse-3  (Пульс-3) — LP record,  Melodiya  record company С60.23883009  
1991  Arsenal  ensemble,  Arsenal 5  (Арсенал 5), LP,  Melodiya  record company.
1991  Arsenal  ensemble,  Arsenal 6  (Арсенал 6), LP,  Melodiyya record company.
 1989—1991 Aleksei Kozlov and Arsenal ensemble, CD,  Melodiya  record company USSR SUCD 60-00 134.
1997 Aleksei   Kozlov and  Arsenal  ensemble  Burned by time  (Опалённые временем) 4 CD, —  IT  company/A. Kozlov. CDRDM 711194, CDRDM 711795, CDRDM 712196, CDRDM 712199.
1998  Intermezzo Hand Made Work, CD, — Smakauz production. SP.01 98.
2001  Virtuoso parallels  (Параллели Виртуозов) / 10 years of  ELKO Technology  company, CD, Limited Edition, — RGB ELKO.
2002  Guitar players of Russia  (Гитаристы России), the set of the best guitar players of Russia, CD, — special edition of the publishing house  Salun AV  (Салон AV  in Russian).
2002  These guys with the guitar  (Эти парни с гитарой), the set of the best guitar players of Russia, CD, — special edition of the publishing house  Salun AV  (Салон AV), CD, 1994 — Strings records STR 001 2.
2004  Crimean Holiday  (Крымские каникулы). Mikhail Smirnov, Ivan Smirnov. CD.

Media

Music
music.download.com

Video
Washburn Days In Russia / featuring: Michael Angelo (U.S.), Ivan Smirnov, Timur Quitelashvili (Тимур Квителашвили in Russian), Igor Boiko, Dmitry Maloletov, Dmitry Chetvergov / VHS-cassette, 1995 Music Box Records MB 002-3.

Literature
 Aleksandr Alekseev. Who is who in Russian rock music.   AST: Astrel: Harvest, 2009.   — p. 446-448. —  (AST). —  (Astrel). —  (Harvest).

References

External links
Official website in Russian / English 
Info about Ivan in Russian

Russian guitarists
Russian male guitarists
1955 births
2018 deaths
Soviet male composers
Russian male composers
Russian film score composers
Soviet film score composers
Musicians from Moscow
Male film score composers
20th-century Russian male musicians